Oslo Nye Teater  is a theater located in  Oslo, Norway. The theater has its main stage in its own theater house at Rosenkrantz' gate 10. It  is one of Norway's most visited theatres. Oslo Nye Teater AS is wholly owned by Oslo Municipality.

History
The theater  opened as Det Nye Teater on February 26, 1929. Architects Gudolf Blakstad (1893–1985) and  Jens Dunker  (1898–1984) were engaged to design the building resulting in a concrete building in a simplified neoclassical style.
In 1994–1995, a thorough upgrade of the audience area in the theater building was carried out under the direction of the architects Kristin Jarmund and  Ola Helle. 

In September 1959,  Oslo Nye Teater  resulted from a merge between Folketeatret and  Det Nye Teater. Folketeatret had operated independently since 1952. 
The operation of Oslo Nye Centralteatret was taken over by Oslo Nye Teater in 1971. Oslo Nye Teater now operates from four stages; Oslo Nye Hovedscenen, Oslo Nye Centralteatret, Oslo Nye Trikkestallen and Oslo Nye Teaterkjeller’n.

References

External links

Oslo Nye Teater (Norwegian only)

Theatres in Oslo
Theatres completed in 1959
1959 establishments in Norway